Daisy Nakalyango (born 15 March 1994) is a Ugandan female badminton player. She competed at the 2010 and 2014 Commonwealth Games.

Achievements

BWF International Challenge/Series
Women's Singles

Women's Doubles

Mixed Doubles

 BWF International Challenge tournament
 BWF International Series tournament
 BWF Future Series tournament

References

External links
 

1994 births
Living people
People from Mbarara
Ugandan female badminton players
Badminton players at the 2010 Commonwealth Games
Badminton players at the 2014 Commonwealth Games
Commonwealth Games competitors for Uganda
Competitors at the 2015 African Games
African Games competitors for Uganda